In linguistics and philosophy of language, the conversational scoreboard is a tuple which represents the discourse context at a given point in a conversation. The scoreboard is updated by each speech act performed by one of the interlocutors.

Most theories of conversational scorekeeping take one of the scoreboard's elements to be a common ground, which represents the propositional information mutually agreed upon by the interlocutors. When an interlocutor makes a successful assertion, its content is added to the common ground. Once in the common ground, that information can then be presupposed by future utterances. Depending on the particular theory of scorekeeping, additional elements of the scoreboard may include a stack of questions under discussion, a list of discourse referents available for anaphora, among other categories of contextual information.

The notion of a conversational scoreboard was introduced by David Lewis in his most-cited paper Scorekeeping in a Language Game. In the paper, Lewis draws an analogy between conversation and baseball, where the scoreboard tracks categories of information such as strikes, outs, and runs, thereby defining the current state of the game and thereby determining which future moves are licit.

See also
 Discourse
 Dynamic semantics
 Indexicality

Notes

Semantics
Pragmatics
Formal semantics (natural language)
Concepts in the philosophy of language